A hardware bug is a defect in the design, manufacture, or operation of computer hardware that causes incorrect operation. It is the counterpart of software bugs which refer to flaws in the code which operates computers, and is the original context in which "bug" was used to refer to such flaws. Intermediate between hardware and software are microcode and firmware which may also have such defects. In common usage, a bug is subtly different from a "glitch" which may be more transient than fundamental, and somewhat different from a "quirk" which may be considered useful or intrinsic. Errata (corrections to the documentation) may be published by the manufacturer to reflect such unintended operation, and "errata" is sometimes used as a term for the flaws themselves.

History 

The Middle English word bugge is the basis for the terms "bugbear" and "bugaboo" as terms used for a monster.

The term "bug" to describe defects has been a part of engineering jargon since the 1870s and predates electronic computers and computer software; it may have originally been used in hardware engineering to describe mechanical malfunctions. For instance, Thomas Edison wrote the following words in a letter to an associate in 1878:

Baffle Ball, the first mechanical pinball game, was advertised as being "free of bugs" in 1931. Problems with military gear during World War II were referred to as bugs (or glitches). In the 1940 film, Flight Command, a defect in a piece of direction-finding gear is called a "bug". In a book published in 1942, Louise Dickinson Rich, speaking of a powered ice cutting machine, said, "Ice sawing was suspended until the creator could be brought in to take the bugs out of his darling."

Isaac Asimov used the term "bug" to relate to issues with a robot in his short story "Catch That Rabbit", published in 1944.

The term "bug" was used in an account by computer pioneer Grace Hopper, who publicized the cause of a malfunction in an early electromechanical computer. A typical version of the story is:

Hopper did not find the bug, as she readily acknowledged. The date in the log book was September 9, 1947. The operators who found it, including William "Bill" Burke, later of the Naval Weapons Laboratory, Dahlgren, Virginia, were familiar with the engineering term and amusedly kept the insect with the notation "First actual case of bug being found." Hopper loved to recount the story. This log book, complete with attached moth, is part of the collection of the Smithsonian National Museum of American History.

Unintended operation

Sometimes users take advantage of the unintended or undocumented operation of hardware to serve some purpose, in which case a flaw may be considered a feature. This gives rise to the often ironically employed acronym INABIAF, "It's Not A Bug It's A Feature". For example, undocumented instructions, known as illegal opcodes, on the MOS Technology 6510 of the Commodore 64 and MOS Technology 6502 of the Apple II computers are sometimes utilized. Similarly programmers 
(notably game and demo) on the Commodore Amiga took advantage of the unintended operation of its coprocessors to produce new effects or optimizations.

Security vulnerabilities

Some flaws in hardware may lead to security vulnerabilities where memory protection or other features fail to work properly. Starting in 2017 a series of security vulnerabilities were found in the implementations of speculative execution on common processor architectures that allowed a violation of privilege level.

In 2019 researchers discovered that a manufacturer debugging mode, known as VISA, had an undocumented feature on Intel Platform Controller Hubs, known as chipsets, which made the mode accessible with a normal motherboard possibly leading to a security vulnerability.

Pentium bugs
The Intel Pentium series of CPUs had two well-known bugs discovered after it was brought to market, the FDIV bug affecting floating point division which resulted in a recall in 1994, and the F00F bug discovered in 1997 which causes the processor to stop operating until rebooted.

See also 
 Software bug

References

Hardware bugs
Engineering concepts